Yeltsovka Airport  is an airport in Novosibirsk Oblast, Russia located 8 km northeast of Novosibirsk. It is a large airfield on the northeast side of Novosibirsk with tarmac space.  It handles Ilyushin Il-76 traffic, and an Antonov factory and government experimental facilities are present.  Some sources give a runway length of 2864 m.

Airports built in the Soviet Union
Airports in Novosibirsk Oblast
Buildings and structures in Novosibirsk